2023 Champions League may refer to:

Football
2022–23 UEFA Champions League
2023–24 UEFA Champions League
2023–24 AFC Champions League
2022–23 CAF Champions League
2023–24 CAF Champions League